National Catholic Church may refer to several independent Christian churches, often part of Independent Catholicism:
 American National Catholic Church
 Lithuanian National Catholic Church
 Mexican Catholic Apostolic Church
 Philippine Independent Church
 Polish National Catholic Church
 Slovak National Catholic Church

See also
 Catholic Church (disambiguation)
 Catholic (disambiguation)
 Polish Catholic (disambiguation)